All About Baby was an early American daytime television children's series, which aired from October 1954 to July 1955 on several stations of the now-defunct DuMont Television Network, including flagship station WABD.

The host was Ruth Crowley, a nurse and childcare expert who had been writing an advice column under the name "Ann Landers" since 1943. On the show, she offered advice to new mothers on how to care for their infant children. The show went off the air just three weeks before Crowley died.

Produced by DuMont affiliate WGN-TV in Chicago, the series originally began as a local show in 1953. Sponsors included Swift Meats and Libby's Baby Food. Episodes aired in a 15-minute time-slot, as was often the case with US daytime series of the era.

Episode status
Although few recordings survive of daytime programs by DuMont stations, three episodes of All About Baby are held by the UCLA Film and Television Archive. These episodes are from June/July 1955.

See also

List of programs broadcast by the DuMont Television Network
List of surviving DuMont Television Network broadcasts
1954–55 United States network television schedule (weekday)
1954–55 United States network television schedule
Happy's Party (1952–53, originated from WDTV in Pittsburgh)
Kids and Company (1951–52)
The Most Important People (1950–51, sponsored by Gerber's Baby Food)
Playroom (1948)

References

Bibliography
David Weinstein, The Forgotten Network: DuMont and the Birth of American Television (Philadelphia: Temple University Press, 2004) 
Alex McNeil, Total Television, Fourth edition (New York: Penguin Books, 1980) 
Tim Brooks and Earle Marsh, The Complete Directory to Prime Time Network TV Shows, Third edition (New York: Ballantine Books, 1964)

External links
All About Baby at IMDB
DuMont historical website

DuMont Television Network original programming
Black-and-white American television shows
English-language television shows
1953 American television series debuts
1955 American television series endings
American non-fiction television series
Child care